Barbara Warren (April 9, 1943August 26, 2008) was an Austrian-American counselor, model, actress, author, and triathlete.

Early life and education 

Born Barbara Müller in St. Johann in Tirol, Austria to Hans and Ingrid Mueller, she and her identical twin sister, Angelika Drake, left their farmhouse at 14 for high school at the Tyrolean capital of Innsbruck and then, at age 17, went on to study art history at the Accademia di Belle Arti Firenze in Florence, Italy.

Career 
The sisters occasionally modeled before moving to Mexico City in 1965, where they began modeling full-time, eventually opening a school, agency and design boutique. Warren began performing under the stage name Barbara Angely, abruptly ending that career out of dissatisfaction with a jet-set lifestyle. Warren eventually married importer Armando Alvarez, which led to a four-year separation from her sister.

Warren's family in 1980 moved to Brownsville, Texas. In 1983, Warren began running recreationally. By 1985, Drake and her family had moved to San Diego, California. Warren, with her family, followed her sister and relocated to San Diego later the same year.

Calling themselves "The Twin Team," the sisters began participating in a number of endurance sports, including their first standard triathlon in 1987 and their first Ironman Triathlon in 1988. All told, Warren completed 13 Ford Ironman Triathlon World Championship in Hawaii, winning her age group in the 2003 Ironman Kona. Warren and her sister were profiled in Reckless: The Outrageous Lives of Nine Kick-Ass Women.

In the early 1990s, she met triathlete Tom Warren, who won the second Ironman competition in 1979, and the two married in 1995.

Warren self-published three motivational books, Unleash the Power to Complete Your Goals, Become Exceptional, and Do What You Don't Want to Do.

Death 
On Saturday, August 23, 2008, Warren broke her odontoid process and cervical vertebra 2 and was diagnosed as paralyzed from a bicycle crash that happened on a descent during the Santa Barbara, California, triathlon. She was put on life support at Santa Barbara Cottage Hospital. According to an account from her family to the San Diego Union-Tribune, she communicated through blinking that she wanted her ventilator turned off, and, at the request of the family, a doctor removed her ventilator on August 26.

Awards 
The Santa Barbara Triathlon's Barbara Warren Community Spirit Award was named posthumously in her honor.

Notes

External links 
 The Twin Team official site
 
 Those Twin Terrors Of Triathlon: Barbara Alvarez and Angelika Castaneda are age-group phenomena, article by Richard Hoffer in Sports Illustrated, November 19, 1990
 Barbara Warren: A reminiscence via IronMan.com

American female triathletes
Austrian female triathletes
Sports deaths in California
1943 births
2008 deaths
Identical twin females
Austrian twins
Sportspeople from San Diego County, California
20th-century American women
20th-century American people
21st-century American women